The Matthew J. and Florence Lynch House and Garden is a house located in southwest Portland, Oregon, listed on the National Register of Historic Places.

See also
National Register of Historic Places listings in Southwest Portland, Oregon
Lynch House (disambiguation)

References

A. E. Doyle buildings
Colonial Revival architecture in Oregon
Houses on the National Register of Historic Places in Portland, Oregon
Southwest Portland, Oregon